Hailey Michele Clauson (born March 7, 1995) is an American model. In 2016, she was one of three separate cover stars of the Sports Illustrated Swimsuit Issue.

Career

Clauson was discovered on an open casting call in Los Angeles, of which Ford Models signed her on the spot, a "surreal" experience she recalled.
Clauson started modeling at age 14, appearing in ad campaigns for Wild Fox Couture, Jag Jeans and in the Forever 21 catalog. Later in 2009 she left Ford Models and signed with Marilyn Agency. That same year she was featured Model of the Month in the October issue of Japanese Vogue. In September 2010 she made her catwalk debut at the spring ADAM show in New York and also walked for Zac Posen and Calvin Klein. Clauson's  debut season yielded such sensational results that MODELS.com listed her to be one of the Top 10 Newcomers for fashion week Spring/Summer 2011.

In 2011, she left Marilyn Agency and signed with Next Models. For SS11, her advertising campaigns included Mavi Jeans, Gucci, Dsquared2, and Jill Stuart. On February 18, Clauson appeared on E! News, accompanied by her mother, for her first television interview. Clauson has appeared in the Fall/Winter campaigns for Topshop, Zara, Moussy and Plein Sud. as well as appearing in Jay-Z’s alternative video, Empire State Of Mind which featured top models.
Clauson appeared on E! News, accompanied by her mother, for her first TV interview which aired in February 18. Five days after her TV interview aired, Hailey became the subject of controversy when it was found out she walked in three of the major shows: Diane von Fürstenberg, DKNY, and Oscar de la Renta in New York Fashion Week being still only 15 years old, when the age limit set by the Council of Fashion Designers of America bans models below 16 for catwalk shows. The fact that von Fürstenberg was president of the CFDA added to the controversy. Fürstenberg later said she didn't know Clauson's age and apologized. Six months later, in August of that same year, Clauson made head-line news again when her parents reportedly were suing Urban Outfitters and two other retailers for the unauthorized use of risqué photos of Hailey on their t-shirts. The suit says the shirts "force" Clauson "to be the object of prurient interests and provides wallpaper for the likes of pedophiles." Clauson's parents sued all three retailers and the photographer for a total of $28 million in damages.  In February 2012, the case against the photographer was dismissed for lack of jurisdiction by the New York based federal court.  The other three defendants settled with Ms. Clauson. Controversy aside, Clauson has appeared in the Fall/Winter campaigns for Topshop, Zara, Moussy and Plein Sud. as well as appearing in Jay-Z’s alternative video, Empire State of Mind which featured top models.

In January 2014, model Hailey Clauson was the focus of an Agent Provocateur advertising campaign called "Behind Closed Doors," which was photographed by Miles Aldridge.

Clauson appeared nude in body paint in the 2015 SI Swimsuit issue.

Personal life 
Clauson is an environmentalist, and has stated that she does not own a car. Cameron Clauson, owner of a local movie company, Clauson Films, has stated he is related to her.

References

External links
 
 
 
 Hailey Clauson at SI Swimsuit

1995 births
Living people
Female models from California
People from Thousand Oaks, California
Ford Models models
21st-century American women